Englewood is an unincorporated community in Boone County, in the U.S. state of Missouri.

History
A post office called Englewood was established in 1892, and remained in operation until 1906. The community was named after Englewood, Illinois.

References

Unincorporated communities in Boone County, Missouri
Unincorporated communities in Missouri